Beth Holmgren (born September 8, 1955) is an American literary critic and a cultural historian in Polish and Russian studies. She is Professor and Chair of the Department of Slavic and Eurasian Studies at Duke University. Recognised for her scholarship in Russian women's studies and Polish cultural history (with a special emphasis on theater), she is  working on a multicultural history of fin-de-siecle Warsaw. Before coming to Duke, she taught at the University of California-San Diego (1987-1993) and the University of North Carolina at Chapel Hill (1993-2007). She earned her B.A at Grinnell College, and two master's degrees (Soviet Studies) and (Slavic Languages and Literatures) and her doctoral doctorate at Harvard University (Ph.D. completed in 1987).

Holmgren served as the president of ASEEES (2008), the largest North American organization in Slavic Studies, and president of the AWSS (2003-2005), the Association for Women in Slavic Studies. During her tenure at ASEEES, she wrote and produced, in collaboration with director Igor' Sopronenko, the film Modern Russian Feminism: Twenty Years Forward, which was first screened at the convention and then issued as a DVD.

Awards and honors 
 1984-5: Fulbright-IREX dissertation fellowship
 1986: JCEE/ACLS Dissertation Fellowship
 1994: Association for Women in Slavic Studies best article
 1995: JCEE/ACLS Postdoctoral Fellowship
 1998: Waclaw Lednicki Humanities Prize, Polish Institute of Arts and Sciences
 2000: Alumni Award, Grinnell College
 2007: AATSEEL Award for Outstanding Contribution to the Profession
 2009: Senior Scholar Award, Southern Conference on Slavic Studies
 2012: Association of Theatre Research Society Barnard Hewitt Award for Theatre History, Honorable Mention
 2012: Association for Women in Slavic Studies best book
 2013: Oscar Halecki Award, Polish American Historical Association
 2014: ASEEES Kulczycki Award
 2017: Wacław Jędrzejewicz Award in Polish History, Piłsudski Institute

Selected Bibliography

Books 
 Warsaw Is My Country: The Story of Krystyna Bierzyńska. Academic Studies Press, February 2018. 
 Starring Madame Modjeska: On Tour in Poland and America Indiana University Press, November 2011. 
 Rewriting Capitalism: Literature and the Market in the Late Tsarist Empire and the Kingdom of Poland. University of Pittsburgh Press, 1998. 
 Women's Works In Stalin's Time: On Lidiia Chukovskaia and Nadezhda Mandrelstam. Indiana University Press, 1993.

Edited Books 
 Transgressive Women in Modern Russian and Eastern European Cultures: From the Bad to the Blasphemous, Co-edited with Yana Hashamova and Mark Lipovetsky. Routledge, 2016. 
 Americans Experience Russia: Encountering the Enigma, 1917-Present. Co-edited with Choi Chatterjee. Routledge, 2013. 
 Poles Apart: Women in Modern Polish Culture. Co-edited with Helena Goscilo, Slavica Press, 2006. 
 The Russian Memoir: History and Literature. Edited by Beth Holmgren. Northwestern University Press, 2003. 
 Russia.*Women*Culture. Co-edited with Helena Goscilo. Indiana University Press. 1996.

Translation 
 Keys to Happiness by Anastasya Verbitskaya. Edited, abridged, translated and introduced by Beth Holmgren and Helena Goscilo. Indiana University Press, 1999.

DVD 
 Modern Russian Feminism: Twenty Years Forward. Written and produced by Beth Holmgren. Directed by Igor’ Sopronenko. Indiana University Press, 2009. Format: Multiple Formats, Dolby, NTSC.

References 

1955 births
Living people
Grinnell College alumni
Harvard University alumni
Duke University faculty
American women academics
Cultural historians
Slavists
American women writers
American women historians
American people of Slavic descent
21st-century American women